Forreria belcheri is a species of sea snail, a marine gastropod mollusk in the family Muricidae, the murex snails or rock snails.

Description
The length of the shell varies between 64 mm and 187 mm.

Distribution
This marine species occurs off California, USA, to Central Baja California, Mexico

References

 Turgeon, D.; Quinn, J.F.; Bogan, A.E.; Coan, E.V.; Hochberg, F.G.; Lyons, W.G.; Mikkelsen, P.M.; Neves, R.J.; Roper, C.F.E.; Rosenberg, G.; Roth, B.; Scheltema, A.; Thompson, F.G.; Vecchione, M.; Williams, J.D. (1998). Common and scientific names of aquatic invertebrates from the United States and Canada: mollusks. 2nd ed. American Fisheries Society Special Publication, 26. American Fisheries Society: Bethesda, MD (USA). . IX, 526 + cd-rom pp.

External links
 

Ocenebrinae
Gastropods described in 1843